Pettancylus is a genus of air-breathing land snails, terrestrial pulmonate gastropod mollusks in the subfamily Ancylinae of the family  Planorbidae.

Species
 Pettancylus baconi (Bourguignat, 1854)
 Pettancylus burnupi (Walker, 1912)
 Pettancylus cawstoni (Walker, 1924)
 Pettancylus ceylanicus (Benson, 1864)
 Pettancylus chudeaui (Germain, 1917)
 Pettancylus clessiniana (Jickeli, 1882)
 Pettancylus clifdeni (Connolly, 1939)
 Pettancylus connollyi (Walker, 1912)
 Pettancylus eburnensis (E. Binder, 1957)
 Pettancylus farquhari (B. Walker, 1912)
 Pettancylus fivefallsiensis (Sankarappan, Chellapandian, Vimalanathan, Mani, Sundaram & Muthukalingan, 2015)
 Pettancylus fontinalis (B. Walker, 1912)
 Pettancylus isseli (Bourguignat, 1866)
 Pettancylus javanus (von Martens, 1897)
 Pettancylus junodi (Connolly, 1925)
 Pettancylus kavirondicus (Mandahl-Barth, 1954)
 Pettancylus lacustris (B. Walker, 1924)
 Pettancylus leonensis (Connolly, 1928)
 Pettancylus lhotelleriei (B. Walker, 1914)
 Pettancylus modestus (Crosse, 1880)
 Pettancylus natalensis (B. Walker, 1924)
 Pettancylus nipponicus (Kuroda, 1949)
 Pettancylus noumeensis (Crosse, 1871)
 Pettancylus pallaryi (Walker, 1914)
 Pettancylus petterdi (R. M. Johnston, 1879)
 Pettancylus ruandensis (Thiele, 1911)
 Pettancylus siamensis (Brandt, 1974)
 Pettancylus tanganyicensis (E.A. Smith, 1906)
 Pettancylus tasmanica (Tenison Woods, 1876)
 Pettancylus tenuis (Bourguignat, 1862)
 Pettancylus toroensis (Mandahl-Barth, 1954)
 Pettancylus verruca (Benson, 1855)
 Pettancylus vicinus (Thiele, 1911)
 Pettancylus victoriensis (B. Walker, 1912)
 Pettancylus viola (Annandale & Prashad, 1921)
 Pettancylus zambesiensis (B. Walker, 1912)
 Pettancylus zambiensis (Mandahl-Barth, 1968)
Species brought into synonymy
 Pettancylus sharpi (Sykes, 1900): synonym of Ferrissia californica (Rowell, 1863)

References

External links
 Iredale, T. (1943). A basic list of the fresh water Mollusca of Australia. The Australian Zoologist. 10(2): 188-230

Planorbidae